John Patrick Farley (born October 29, 1968) is an American actor and comedian. He is the youngest brother of actor and comedian Chris Farley.

Early life and education 
Farley was born in Madison, Wisconsin, the son of Mary Anne (née Crosby), a housewife, and Thomas "Tom" Farley Sr., who owned an oil company. He was raised in an Irish Catholic family. He is the youngest brother of actors Chris Farley and Kevin Farley. He earned a Bachelor of Arts degree in marketing from Regis University in 1992 and later studied at The Second City in Chicago.

Career 
Farley has received many roles from his older brother's fellow SNL alums, such as Adam Sandler, David Spade, and Rob Schneider. His notable film work includes The Waterboy and The Benchwarmers. He also has small roles in You Don't Mess with the Zohan, Joe Dirt, Almost Heroes, and Extreme Movie. He also appears on multiple episodes of Frank TV and in one episode on the sitcom Rules of Engagement.

In 1997, he appeared as a regular performer in Sports Bar, a sketch-comedy show that ended in 1998.

In 2015, Farley appeared, with his brother, Kevin, in the documentary I Am Chris Farley, about the life of his brother, Chris, alongside many other Hollywood stars, like Adam Sandler and Dan Aykroyd.

In 2019, Farley appeared on the Comedy Central series Lights Out with David Spade, where he is also the television show's announcer.

Personal life 
He is married to actress Jennifer Herron and has three children. On December 18, 1997, Farley was the one who found his older brother Chris dead from a drug overdose.

Filmography

Film

Television

References

External links 

1968 births
American male comedians
American people of Irish descent
21st-century American comedians
Living people
Actors from Madison, Wisconsin
Regis University alumni
Male actors from Wisconsin